The Taganrog Drama Theater named after Anton Chekhov and decorated with Order of Honor is a traditional Russian drama theater based in Taganrog, Rostov Oblast.

Foundation and early years
The Taganrog Theater was established in 1827 by governor Alexander Dunaev. The theater was subsidized by the Taganrog's City Council since 1828, and its first director was Alexander Gor. The first group of Russian drama artists was directed by Perovsky and toured around the region, giving performances in Rostov on Don, Novocherkassk, Bahmut. The repertoire consisted mainly of dramas, melodramas and vaudevilles.

Italian opera
Since 1861, Italian opera regularly performed in Taganrog. In 1865 was created a stock company to finance the construction of the new theater building. Forty-five thousand silver rubles of stocks were issued, for the total budget of 55,000 rubles. In 1866, Taganrog established its very own Italian opera in a new opera theater building by the project of the architect Londeron from Odessa. The interiors of the theater were designed after the image of the Milano opera theater La Scala. The repertoire of that time included Giuseppe Verdi, Gioachino Rossini, Jacques Offenbach, Vincenzo Bellini, Mikhail Glinka, Pyotr Tchaikovsky and others.

In 1874, the Taganrog Municipality acquired the theater building by the purchase of its stocks. The newly established theater commission decided to dissolve the Italian opera in 1875 for commercial reasons. One of the Taganrog Italian opera's directors and choirmasters - Gaetano Molla - stayed in Taganrog after the opera theater was closed and contributed to promotion and development of music culture in the city of Taganrog.

Young Anton Chekhov in the theater
Anton Chekhov who was born in Taganrog in 1860 was in love with theater and literature from his childhood. The first performance that he attended was Offenbach's operette Elena the Beautiful onstage Taganrog City Theater on October 4, 1873. Anton was a 13-year-old Gymnasium student, and from that moment on, Chekhov became a great theater lover and spent there virtually all his savings.

His favorite seat in the theater was at the back gallery for it was cheap (40 silver kopeks), and because Gymnasium students needed a special authorisation to go to the theater. The permission was given not often and mostly for the weekends. Sometimes, Anton Chekhov and other fellow students disguised themselves and even wore some makeup, spectacles or a fake beard, trying to fool the regular school staff who checked for unauthorized presence of students.

Later years
In 1901, the first movie was shown onstage Taganrog City Theater.

In 1935, during the 75th Anniversary Celebrations of Anton Chekhov's birthday, the famous artists of the Moscow Art Theater performed onstage of Taganrog Theater: Olga Knipper, Tarasova, Vishnevskaya, Moskvin and others.

In 1944, the Soviet of People's Commissars of USSR named the Taganrog City Theater after Anton Pavlovich Chekhov.

In 1960, the artists of Taganrog Chekhov Drama Theater performed onstage of the Kremlin Palace of Congress in Moscow within the framework of the centennial celebrations of Anton Chekhov's birthday.

In 1965, the Chekhov Drama Theater was praised in the Moscow THEATRE magazine for outstanding production of the Chekhov's play Ivanov, starring Petr Shelokhonov in the leading role.

In 1977, the theater was decorated with the Order of Honor (Russian Federation).

Since 1980, the theater festival In the Birthplace of Anton Chekhov has been held with participation of theaters from Russia, Ukraine, Georgia, Italy, Croatia, Spain, Australia, Belarus, Germany and Japan.

In 2002 and in 2010, the theater performed at the International Literary & Musical Forum in Badenweiler, Germany, staging Anton Chekhov's Proposal and The Wood Demon.

In October 2006, the theater participated at the 1st International Blacksea Theater Festival in Mykolaiv, Ukraine.

In April 2009, the theater won 3 awards at the International Theater Festival "Golden Key" in Donetsk, Ukraine.

On January 29, 2010 within the framework of Anton Chekhov's 150th birth anniversary celebrations in Taganrog, the President of Russia Dmitri Medvedev visited the Taganrog theater, where he watched a rehearsal of the performance "Everything Starts in the Childhood", dedicated to Anton Chekhov.

In October–November 2012 the Taganrog Drama Theater hosted the international production "Passions of Romeo" (IUGTE International Shakespeare Performance Project - "Страсти по Ромео.like/unlike". Театральные сновидения по мотивам пьесы В.Шекспира "Ромео и Джульетта"). The performance was created with participation of Russian actors in collaboration with the international production group (Ireland, Spain, Greece, UK, Mexico, Switzerland, USA).

Gallery

Notable people throughout the history of the theater
Anton Chekhov - Russian playwright and short-story writer
Ivan Perestiani - People's Artist of the Georgian SSR
Sergei Bondarchuk - Soviet film director, screenwriter, and actor, People's Artist of the USSR, Academy Award(1968).
Elena Obraztsova - opera singer, People's Artist of USSR 
Natalia Obraztsova - Russian writer and poet
Aristarkh Livanov - Russian actor, designated People's artist of Russia (1999). 
Gaetano Molla 
Nestor Kukolnik - Russian playwright and prose writer
Samuel Maykapar - Russian composer
Petr Shelokhonov - Russian actor, designated Honorable Actor of Russia (1979).
Vatslav Dvorzhetsky - Soviet Russian actor
Yelizaveta Solodova - Soviet Russian actress

References 
Notes

Sources
 Taganrog Encyclopedia (Энциклопедия Таганрога), 2nd edition, Taganrog, 2003

External links
 Taganrog Drama Theater named after Anton Chekhov - Official Web Site (Russian)
 Official web site of Taganrog, Birthplace of Anton Chekhov

Theatres in Russia
1827 establishments in the Russian Empire
Buildings and structures in Taganrog
Tourist attractions in Taganrog
Cultural heritage monuments in Taganrog
Cultural heritage monuments of regional significance in Rostov Oblast